Aechmea pectinata is a species of flowering plant in the Bromeliaceae family. This species is endemic to southeastern Brazil, from Rio de Janeiro State south to Santa Catarina.

References

pectinata
Flora of Brazil
Plants described in 1879
Taxa named by John Gilbert Baker